Tomislav Hohnjec (born 13 November 1979) is a Croatian male canoeist who won a world championship at senior level at the Wildwater Canoeing World Championships and twice the Wildwater Canoeing World Cup

References

External links
 Tomislav Hohnjec at Kajakaški Savez Zagreb 

1979 births
Living people
Croatian male canoeists